Baden District is a district in the canton of Aargau, Switzerland. The district capital is the town of Baden and the largest municipality is Wettingen, located in the Limmat Valley (German: Limmattal).

Geography
Of this area, 37.1% is used for agricultural purposes, while 38.5% is forested. The rest of the land, (22.4%) is settled.

History
The district is descended from the historic County of Baden, which was dissolved in 1798 upon the creation of the short-lived Canton of Baden (1798–1803). The first district of Baden existed during the existence of that canton, covering part of the former county, and upon its merging into the canton of Aargau, the contemporary district was formed.

Upon the merging of the canton of Baden into Aargau in 1803, the district gained the municipalities of Würenlingen, Bellikon, Künten, Remetschwil, Stetten, Mellingen, Wohlenschwil and Mägenwil (from neighbouring districts of the canton of Baden) but had to give up Hüttikon, Oetwil an der Limmat, Dietikon and Schlieren to the Canton of Zurich.

Demographics

, there were 6,801 homes with 1 or 2 persons in the household, 26,662 homes with 3 or 4 persons in the household, and 15,363 homes with 5 or more persons in the household.  The average number of people per household was 2.28 individuals.   there were 16,394 single family homes (or 27.4% of the total) out of a total of 59,766 homes and apartments.

Of the school age population, there are 8,595 students attending primary school, there are 3,206 students attending secondary school, there are 1,949 students attending tertiary or university level schooling, there are 25 students who are seeking a job after school in the municipality.

Economy
 there were 63,243 residents who worked in the district, while 48,284 residents worked outside the district and 36,923 people commuted into the district for work.

Religion
Of the rest of the population, there are 207 individuals (or about 0.18% of the population) who belong to the Christian Catholic faith.

Municipalities

Mergers
The following changes to the district's municipalities have occurred since 2000:

 2006: Oberehrendingen and Unterehrendingen combined to create Ehrendingen

References

Districts of Aargau